1-Tetradecanol, or commonly myristyl alcohol (from Myristica fragrans – the nutmeg plant), is a straight-chain saturated fatty alcohol, with the molecular formula CH3(CH2)12CH2OH.  It is a white waxy solid that is practically insoluble in water, soluble in diethyl ether, and slightly soluble in ethanol.

Production
1-Tetradecanol may be prepared by the hydrogenation of myristic acid (or its esters); myristic acid itself can be found in nutmeg (from where it gains its name) but is also present in palm kernel oil and coconut oil and it is from these that the majority of 1-tetradecanol is produced. It may also be produced from petrochemical feedstocks via either the Ziegler process.

Uses
As with other fatty alcohols, 1-tetradecanol is used as an ingredient in cosmetics such as cold creams for its emollient properties.  It is also used as an intermediate in the chemical synthesis of other products such as surfactants.

Toxicity
Like other fatty alcohols, myristyl alcohol has very low acute toxicity, with LD50 >5000 mg/kg (oral, rat).

References

External links
 (MSDS for 1-tetradecanol / Myristyl Alcohol)

Fatty alcohols
Cosmetics chemicals
Primary alcohols
Alkanols